The M.39B Libellula (from Libellulidae, a taxonomic family of dragonflies) was a Second World War tandem wing experimental aircraft built by Miles Aircraft, designed to give the pilot the best view possible for landing on aircraft carriers. A scale version of the M.39 design was proposed by Miles to meet Air Ministry specification B.11/41 for a fast bomber. The M.39B was used by Miles to generate data from which the M.39 design was improved, but the M.39 project was cancelled and the M.39B broken up.

Design and development

M.39
Though it had some problems, the earlier M.35 proved sufficient to show the idea had merits, and the larger M.39 was drawn up as a twin-engined design prepared to meet Specification B.11/41 which had been issued by the Air Ministry for a high speed bomber. The specification had been written for the P.1005 proposal by Hawker, powered by two Napier Sabre engines, estimated to achieve 400+ mph at 25,000 ft and deliver a 2,000 lb bomb load over 1,600 miles. The P.1005 was cancelled after several delays on behalf of the Air Ministry and before Miles submitted his design to the Ministry in July. In November 1943 a full-size prototype (to use the serial RR910) was ordered, but not built.

Until the intended (three) Power Jets W.2/500 turbojets were available the M.39 would have had two Rolls-Royce Merlin 60 inline or Bristol Hercules VIII radial piston engines. The M.39 would have a crew of three in a pressurized cabin. As well as the bomb-bay amidships, the M.39 was intended to carry two fixed 20 mm cannons in the roots of the forward wings.

M.39B
To prove the concept Miles designed and built a 5/8th scale version, the M.39B, which flew on 22 July 1943, showing no "undesirable handling" characteristics. It coincided with interest by the authorities in unorthodox designs for large aircraft. The rear wing was mounted higher than the forward one to avoid downwash and give ground clearance for the propellers. The M39 design had inboard flaps and outboard ailerons on the rear wing and the front wing had an auxiliary aerofoil/flap/elevator device, which could vary the wing area without changing lift coefficient. 
 
The Ministry of Aircraft Production agreed a development contract and purchase of the M.39B. Miles continued testing, generating more flight data and submitted an improved M.39 design in early 1944. Meanwhile, the sole M.39B passed to the Royal Aircraft Establishment at Farnborough in 1944, where it carried the serial SR392, being damaged and repaired after two accidents, only to be broken up with the full-sized bomber project's cancellation.

Specifications (M.39B Mockup)

See also

References
Notes

Bibliography

 Brown, Don Lambert. Miles Aircraft Since 1925. London: Putnam & Company Ltd., 1970. . 
 Mondey, David. The Hamlyn Concise Guide to British Aircraft of World War II. London: Chancellor Press, 2002. .
 Buttler, Tony. British Secret Projects Fighters & Bombers, 1935–1950. Hinckley: Midland Publications, 2004. .

Further reading
 Amos, Peter and Don Lambert Brown. Miles Aircraft Since 1925, Volume 1. London: Putnam Aeronautical, 2000. .
 Bridgman, Leonard (ed.) Jane's fighting aircraft of World War II. London: Crescent, 1998.  
 Brown, Eric. "The Lovelorn Libellula." Air Enthusiast Five November 1977 – February 1978. Bromley, Kent, UK: Pilot Press Ltd., 1977.
 "The Miles 'Dragonflies'" Aeroplane Monthly, June 1973. London: IPC Media Ltd. ISSN 0143-7240.

External links

 
 
 
Miles Tandem Monoplanes Flight 1944
pictures of Miles Tandem Monoplanes – Flight 1944
 

1940s British experimental aircraft
Cancelled military aircraft projects of the United Kingdom
Libellula
Tandem-wing aircraft
Aircraft first flown in 1943
Twin piston-engined tractor aircraft